Billboard Top Hits: 1983 is a compilation album released by Rhino Records in 1992, featuring 10 hit recordings from 1983.

The track lineup includes four songs ("Down Under", "Africa", "Maniac" and "Total Eclipse of the Heart") that reached the top of the Billboard Hot 100 chart, with the remaining six songs each reaching the top five of the chart. The album was certified Gold by the RIAA on July 3, 1997.

Track listing

Track information and credits were taken from the album's liner notes.

References 

1992 compilation albums
Billboard Top Hits albums